Nana Mensah may refer to:
 Nana Mensah (footballer)
 Nana Mensah (actress)